This is a list of flag bearers who have represented Romania at the Olympics.

Flag bearers carry the national flag of their country at the opening ceremony of the Olympic Games.

See also
Romania at the Olympics

References

Romania at the Olympics
Romania
Olympic flagbearers